Roland Khoury (1930—1988) was a Syrian painter.

Biography
Khoury was born in Antioch in 1930. He moved to Aleppo where he finished his college in 1950, afterwards worked as a teacher in Syria until 1955, when he left to go to Italy to study painting at Accademia di belle arti di Roma in 1956 from which he graduated on 1960.

In 1962 he won the first prize of San Vito Romano's (Provincial Agency for Tourism in Rome) Contest & Exhibition in Italy.
In 1963 he represented Syria at the International exhibition which took place in "Galleria d'Arte d'Urso" Siena – Italy.
In 1964 he got the {G .B. Salvi e Piccola Europa} diplomas from the Italian Sassoferrato's city as well as the silver medal.

In 1964 he participated in Italy's most important exhibitions, Venice Biennale International Art Exhibition, in which effect he wrote a manifesto about the Contemporary art which contest explained his point of view regarding the modern movements of arts. This manifesto found a big acceptance and popularity in both Arabic and European medias and had been published in the Syrian press then printed as a booklet with name The Suggestive Realism. In the same year this booklet has been translated to many other languages and published in Italy and in some other European countries.

In 1965 he left Italy to make a wall-painting to the hall of winter sports in Aleppo (Youths Patronage) of 400 meter square and returned in 1969 to Italy to stay until 1970.
In 1970 he returned home and then left to Lebanon to have an artistic activity there for two years, afterwards he moved to Rome in 1975 where he got the {PREMIO CRONACA 75} awards of Art, Culture & Media.

Exhibitions

Collective Exhibitions
 At "Palazzo delle Esposizioni" in Rome on 1962.
 Awarded the 1st Prize ex-aequo at "VIII S. Vito Romano Contest" on 8 November 1962.
 Represented Syria  at the International Art Exhibition in "Galleria d'Arte d'Urso" in June 1963.
 In Fiuggi in August 1963.
 At "Galleria Stagni" on 2 January 1964.
 Participation in the "XXXII International Biennial for Contemporary Art" in Venice on 20 June 1964.
 Awarded silver medal in the competition of  "G.B. Salvi e Piccola Europa" in Sassoferrato on 1964.
 At "Palazzo delle Esposizioni" in "Rome" 21 March 1968.
 In Fiumicino on 13 August 1977.
 At the Syrian Embassy in Rome on 29 October 1977.
 Participation in the Spring exhibition at the National Museum of Aleppo on 5 May 1985.
 At "OUMAIA Gallery for Art and Culture" in Aleppo on 1987.

Personal Exhibitions
 At the Cultural Center of Aleppo in February 1961.
 At the Cultural Center of Homs in April 1961.
 In Damascus in July 1961.
 At "Galleria Giotto" in Rome in July 1962.
 At "Galleria Stagni" in Rome on 18 October 1963.
 In Damascus on 29 August 1964.
 In Aleppo on 9 October 1964.
 At "Galleria Il Cavalletto" in Rome on 8 February 1969
 In Aleppo on 10 December 1970.
 At The Town Hall of Dhour El Choueir in Beirut on 28 August 1972.
 In Beirut on 2 November 1972.
 At the "People's Hall for Fine Arts" in Damascus on 1 October 1974.
 At the National Museum of Aleppo on 9 December 1974.
 At the Gallery "Il Sigillo" in Rome on 7 June 1975.
 At the French Cultural Center in Damascus on 15 June 1982.

References

External links
Official Website
Discover Syria
Nouh World

1930 births
1988 deaths
People from Antioch
Syrian painters
Syrian Christians
20th-century painters
Syrian artists